Rat Film is a 2016 documentary directed by American filmmaker Theo Anthony employing techniques of essay and collage. The documentary uses rat infestation in Baltimore as a starting point to explore issues of segregation, redlining, poverty, and resource allocation in U.S. cities.

The film had its world premiere at the 2016 Locarno Film Festival and its U.S. premiere within the 2017 True/False Film Festival, as well as screening at festivals such as the 2017 International Film Festival Rotterdam, the 2017 South by Southwest Film Conference & Festival, and the 2018 Copenhagen International Documentary Festival. Rat Film had its television premiere as part of the PBS series Independent Lens on February 26, 2018.

Rat Film composer Dan Deacon was nominated for Outstanding Achievement in Original Music Score and director Theo Anthony was nominated for Outstanding Achievement in a Debut Feature Film at the 2018 Cinema Eye Honors.

References

External links

American documentary films
American independent films
Documentary films about nature
2016 films
2016 documentary films
Films set in Baltimore
Films shot in Baltimore
Films about mice and rats
2016 independent films
2010s American films